"Som stormen" is a song written by Lars Diedricson, Carina Bergsman Danielsson and Eddie Jonsson, and performed by  Sara Löfgren at Melodifestivalen 2004. Participating at the first deltog semifinal in Karlstad on 21 February 2004, it went directly to the finals in Stockholm, where it ended up 7th.

The single, released the same year, peaked at 16th position at the Swedish singles chart. The song also charted at Svensktoppen for three weeks between 16-30 May 2004.

Charts

References

2004 songs
2004 singles
Melodifestivalen songs of 2004
Swedish-language songs
Songs written by Lars Diedricson